The 1950 La Flèche Wallonne was the 14th edition of La Flèche Wallonne cycle race and was held on 1 May 1950. The race started in Charleroi and finished in Liège. The race was won by Fausto Coppi.

General classification

References

1950 in road cycling
1950
1950 in Belgian sport
1950 Challenge Desgrange-Colombo